The white-throated manakin (Corapipo gutturalis) is a species of bird in the family Pipridae. It is found in Brazil, French Guiana, Guyana, Suriname, and Venezuela. Its natural habitat is subtropical or tropical moist lowland forest.

Taxonomy

In 1760 the French zoologist Mathurin Jacques Brisson included a description of the white-throated manakin in his Ornithologie. He used the French name Le manakin à gorge blanche and the Latin Manacus gutture albo. Although Brisson coined Latin names, these do not conform to the binomial system and are not recognised by the International Commission on Zoological Nomenclature. When in 1766 the Swedish naturalist Carl Linnaeus updated his Systema Naturae for the twelfth edition, he added 240 species that had been previously described by Brisson. One of these was the white-throated manakin. Linnaeus included a brief description, coined the binomial name Pipra gutturalis and cited Brisson's work. The specific name gutturalis is Medieval Latin for "of the thoat". This species is now placed in the genus Corapipo that was introduced by the French naturalist Charles Lucien Bonaparte in 1854. The white-throated manakin is monotypic.

References

white-throated manakin
Birds of the Amazon Basin
Birds of the Guianas
white-throated manakin
white-throated manakin
Taxonomy articles created by Polbot